Before the Storm (Före stormen) is a drama film directed by Reza Parsa released in 2000.

Synopsis 
Leo is a Swedish teenager who is bullied at school and Ali is a taxi driver who is blackmailed by terrorists. Surrounded by violence in their lives, both try to solve their problems.

Cast 
 Per Graffman as Ali
 Maria Lundqvist  as Ali's wife
 Emil Odepark  as Leo
 Martin Wallström  as Danne
 Tintin Anderzon  as  Leo's mother
 Christer Fant  as  Leo's father
 Sasha Becker  as  Sara
 Anni Ececioglu  as  Jenny
 Claes Ljungmark  as Johan Sander

Reception 
Jonathan Holland of Variety gave the movie a positive review saying that is "strongly scripted and well-played treat convincingly employs thriller elements to make its heavyweight agenda palatable ... Parallels between the two tales of violence and submission are not overdone. Script is content to point out that power games exist at every social level, from the local and domestic to the global, and that the two are not easily disentangled."

References

External links 
 

Swedish crime drama films
Swedish teen drama films
Films about bullying
Swedish teen films
Films about terrorism
Films about families
2000 crime drama films
2000s thriller films
2000s Swedish-language films
2000 directorial debut films
2000 films
2000s Swedish films